Burton Hastings is a village and civil parish in the English county of Warwickshire.

Location 
The nearest railway station is at Nuneaton. The northern parish boundary is a little south of the A5 trunk road known as Watling Street which is also the county boundary at this point between Warwickshire and Leicestershire. The northern boundary is marked by the Soar Brook which divides it from nearby Stretton Baskerville. The boundary to west and south is with Nuneaton, Bulkington, and Wolvey and the River Anker. The eastern boundary follows the road from Wolvey to Hinckley. A branch of the Coventry Canal system, known as the Ashby Canal passes through the west of the parish. The name derives from the Hastings family who held the manor until 1529. Burton Hastings is often used by commuters who work in nearby towns.

Population 
The current population of the village is around 250, falling to 226 at the 2011 Census. In 2001 there were 92 houses in the village, on five streets all of which branch off from Hinckley Road.

Religion 
The parish Church is called Saint Botolph and is located at the centre of the village.

External links

 Map of Burton Hastings
 St Botolph's Church, Burton Hastings - Website

References 

Villages in Warwickshire